The New York Drama Critics Awards (formed 1943) are awarded through the composite opinion of a sample of New York Drama Critics to recognize Excellence in Broadway Theater.  Awards are given each season for Best Performance by an Actor, Best Performance by an Actress, Best Male Performance in a Musical, Best Femme Performance in a Musical, Best Performance by an Actor in a Supporting Role, Best Performance by an Actress in a Supporting Role, Most Promising Young Actor, Most Promising Young Actress, Best Directing Job, Best Scene-Designing Job, and Best Musical Score (further specified to Composer/Lyric Writer/Librettist). An award for Best Dance Director or Choreographer was added in the 1944–1945 season. Two new categories, most promising new playwright and best new director, were added for the 1946–1947 season.

1942-1943 season

1943–1944 season

1944-1945 season

1945-1946 season

1946-1947 season

1947-1948 season

References

American theater awards
Awards established in 1943
1943 establishments in New York City